Sovetsky City District is one of the eight districts of the city of Nizhny Novgorod, Russia. Population:  Area: .

The district administration is located on Sovetskaya Square.

References

City districts of Nizhny Novgorod